Stryjenszczyzna  is a hamlet in the administrative district of Gmina Gródek, within Białystok County, Podlaskie Voivodeship, in north-eastern Poland, close to the border with Belarus.

The hamlet has a population of 70.

References

Stryjenszczyzna